Markovich is a Slavic patronymic name originating from the given name Mark, and means “son of the god of war”. It is also a Jewish surname that may refer to

Aaron Markovich of Wilna, court Jew of King Władysław IV Vasa of Poland in the 17th century
Anastasiya Markovich (born 1979), Ukrainian painter
Erez Markovich (born 1978), Israeli basketball player
Mitch Markovich (born 1944), American percussionist and composer
Mónika Markovich (born 1982), Hungarian harpist, musician
Yael Markovich, Israeli/American model and beauty pageant titleholder
Yuliya Markovich (born 1989), Kazakhstani handball player